Alexandre Villaplane (24 December 1904 – 27 December 1944) was a French football player who played as a midfielder. He played for France at the 1928 Summer Olympics and captained the national team at the 1930 FIFA World Cup. Villaplane was also a Nazi collaborator who was arrested and executed for his actions during World War II.

Football career
In his career he played for Sète (1921–1924), Nîmes (1927–1929), Racing Club de France (1929–1932), Antibes (1932–1933) and Nice (1933–1934). He was capped 25 times for the France national team and was the captain of the French side which went to the 1930 FIFA World Cup.

He played for Antibes in the first French professional championship in 1932–33. The League was divided into a Northern and a Southern section with each section made up of ten teams. Antibes finished top of the table in the Southern section and played Lille from the North for the Championship. Antibes won the match and the French league but were stripped of their title after being found guilty of match-fixing. The Lille manager was given a lifetime ban, but Villaplane, who was strongly suspected of fixing the matches, received only a small penalty. Villaplane then joined OGC Nice for the 1933–34 season. Having lost interest in his career and having become a regular horse race-goer, he made one last attempt to resurrect his career with the Bordeaux Second Division club Hispano-Bastidienne, but he ended the season in prison, having been sentenced for his part in a horse race-fixing scandal.

Criminal career
At the beginning of World War II, Villaplane became involved in the Parisian black market and in racketeering the local Jewish population. He was sentenced to two months imprisonment for possession of stolen goods in 1940. Through his criminal background, he came to the attention of the French Carlingue, an organisation formed by the German Reich Security Main Office to conduct counter-insurgency operations against the French Resistance. The group, which was made up of collaborating criminals, was known colloquially as the French Gestapo. It was jointly run by two Parisian gangsters, Henri Lafont and Pierre Bonny. Members utilised their criminal expertise and networks working for the Nazi security services in occupied France and Vichy. Villaplane specialised in the racketeering of gold merchants.

In 1942, he left Paris for Toulouse to escape the Germans he had been trying to flee. His former teammate Louis Cazal obtained new identity papers for him and he returned to Paris. He was arrested by the SS in 1943 for the theft of a quantity of precious stones and imprisoned at the Compiègne camp, although Lafont succeeded in obtaining his release.

Villaplane then became Bonny's chauffeur and then, in 1944, head of one of the five sections of the North African Brigade, a criminal organisation made up of North African immigrants who collaborated with the Nazis through anti-Resistance activities. The fierce character of his recruits earned him the unflattering nickname of "SS Mohammed". He obtained both the rank and uniform of an SS-Untersturmführer. His section was put in charge of finding Resistance members and their supporters in the region of Périgueux in the month of March 1944, and then in the region of Eymet in the following month. It was in Eymet that he negotiated for the lives of hostages for money. On 11 June 1944, the day following the massacre at Oradour-sur-Glane, his squad had 52 people executed in Mussidan.

Execution
He was sentenced to death on 1 December 1944 for his direct involvement in at least 10 killings. He was executed by firing squad on 27 December 1944 at the Fort de Montrouge, Arcueil.

References

Further reading 
 Luc Briand, Le brassard, Alexandre Villaplane, capitaine des Bleus et officier nazi, Plein Jour, 2022 (in French)

External links
Le footballeur qui voulait être un SS
Tifo Football. 2018. Alexandre Villaplane: Football’s Psychopath?
 
 

1904 births
1944 deaths
Footballers from Algiers
Pieds-Noirs
French footballers
French gangsters
French mass murderers
France international footballers
FC Sète 34 players
Nîmes Olympique players
Racing Club de France Football players
OGC Nice players
Ligue 1 players
Ligue 2 players
Association football midfielders
Olympic footballers of France
Footballers at the 1928 Summer Olympics
1930 FIFA World Cup players
Nazi collaborators shot at the Fort de Montrouge
FC Antibes players
Algerian people executed abroad
Sportspeople convicted of crimes
SS-Untersturmführer
Executed mass murderers